Lennard may refer to:

Lennard Freeman (born 1995), American basketball player in the Israeli Basketball Premier League
Lennard Pearce (1915–1984), English actor 
Dave Lennard (born 1944), English footballer
Henry Lennard (16th–17th century), English baron and politician
John Lennard (born 1964), Professor of Literature at the University of the West Indies, Jamaica
Sampson Lennard (16th–17th century), English Member of Parliament
Lennard baronets, either of two extinct baronetcies

See also
Lenard
Leonard